Duck Lake is a lake located on Vancouver Island east of Lizard Lake on the south side of upper China Creek, south east of Port Alberni, The lake lies at an elevation of  above sea level in the China Creek Community Watershed.

References

Alberni Valley
Lakes of Vancouver Island
Alberni Land District